Zdzisław Kazimierz Chmielewski (born 4 October 1942 in Falborz) is a Polish historian, rector of Szczecin University, Member of the European Parliament (MEP) (elected on 13 June 2004).

See also
 2004 European Parliament election in Poland

References

1942 births
Living people
People from Włocławek County
University of Szczecin alumni
20th-century Polish historians
Polish male non-fiction writers
MEPs for Poland 2004–2009